The 2016–17 Big East Conference men's basketball season began with practices in October 2016, followed by the start of the 2016–17 NCAA Division I men's basketball season in November. This season marked the 38th year in the conference's history, but the fourth as a non-football conference, which officially formed on July 1, 2013.  Conference play began on December 31, 2016.

Villanova clinched the regular season championship, their fourth straight Big East regular season championship, with a win over No. 23-ranked Creighton on February 25. Butler finished second, three games behind Villanova.

Villanova shooting guard Josh Hart was named the conference's Player of the Year. Butler head coach Chris Holtmann was named Big East Coach of the Year.

The Big East Conference tournament at Madison Square Garden in New York from March 8 through March 11, 2017. Villanova also won the Big East Conference tournament beating Creighton in the Tournament championship game. As a result, Villanova received the conference's automatic bid to the NCAA tournament.

Seven Big East Schools (Villanova, Butler, Creighton, Marquette, Providence, Seton Hall, and Xavier) received bids to the NCAA Tournament. The conference finished with a 5–7 record in the Tournament, highlighted by Butler reaching the Sweet Sixteen and Xavier advancing to the Elite Eight.

Head coaches

Coaches 

Notes: 
 Year at school includes 2016–17 season.
 Overall and Big East records are from time at current school and are through the end the 2016–17 season. 
 Mack's A-10 and McDermott's MVC conference records not included since teams began play in Big East.

Preseason

Preseason poll 
Prior to the season, the Big East conducted a poll of Big East coaches, coaches do not place their own team on their ballots.

Preseason All-Big East teams
Source

Rankings

Player of the week
Source

Regular season

Conference matrix
This table summarizes the head-to-head results between teams in conference play through February 14, 2017.

Honors and awards

All-Big East Awards and Teams

Postseason

2017 Big East tournament

NCAA tournament 

The winner of the Big East tournament received an automatic bid to the 2017 NCAA Division I men's basketball tournament.

References

External links
Big East website